Zambellas is a surname. Notable people with the surname include:

George Zambellas (born 1958), British admiral
Michalakis Zambellas (1937–2019), Cypriot businessman, politician, and philanthropist

See also
Zambelli